Invasion of the Spiders: Remixed... and Unreleased Tracks is a two-disc compilation album by Space, released on 12 August 1997 on Gut Records. Disc one consists of several remixes by the group (mainly from their keyboard player Franny Griffiths, credited under the aliases Frannie Asprin) and other artists, whilst the second disc compiles tracks that have previously appeared as B-sides.

The album's sleeve makes reference to the Pillars of Creation, an iconic photograph taken by the Hubble Space Telescope in 1995 demonstrating a formation of stars in the Eagle Nebula.

Track listing

References

1997 compilation albums
1997 remix albums
Space (English band) albums
Gut Records albums